The Thoen Stone is a sandstone slab dated 1834 that was discovered in the Black Hills of South Dakota by Louis Thoen in 1887. The discovery of the stone called into question the first discovery of gold and the history of gold mining in the Black Hills; it would mean that gold was discovered in the Black Hills 40 years before the Custer Expedition of 1874 and the subsequent Black Hills Gold Rush. It is currently on display at the Adams Museum & House in Deadwood, South Dakota.

History
The early history of the people mentioned on the stone is limited. Two experienced miners were among the party of seven: William King and Indian Crow. According to the stone, Ezra Kind and his party traveled to the Black Hills in 1833 in search of gold, at which time a treaty prevented the party from entering the area legally. The stone itself was inscribed in 1834 by Ezra Kind after his entire party was killed by Native Americans. Kind himself later died of unknown causes.

On March 14, 1887, Norwegian immigrants and brothers Louis and Ivan Thoen discovered the slab while collecting sandstone on the west face of Lookout Mountain near his home in Spearfish. The stone was buried several feet below the surface. The men took the slab home, and Louis invited Henry Keats (a later mayor of Spearfish) to see the stone and the location where it was found. The stone was then taken to the Spearfish Register. One day later, Louis decided to display it in a store in Spearfish that was owned by John Cashner; Cashner and Louis sold pictures of the stone as postcards. In 1888, Cashner traveled to the Detroit Free Press in Michigan and sold the story of the stone to the newspaper. Louis died in 1919 during the 1918 influenza pandemic. The stone was named for Louis Thoen. In 1966, historian Frank Thomson published a book about the stone, titled The Thoen Stone: A Saga of the Black Hills. A monument complete with a replica of the stone was later placed on a hill above the Spearfish City Park, and an annual seven-mile run past the marker is named after the stone.

Doom metal band Pine Beetle has a song called "Thoen" which is based on the Thoen Stone mystery.

Description
The Thoen Stone is carved out of sandstone. It is three inches thick and measures 10 inches by eight inches.

Inscription
Text is written in a cursive font on both sides of the slab. The inscription on the front reads:
Came to these hills in 1833 seven of us
DeLacompt
Ezra Kind
G.W. Wood
T. Brown
R. Kent
Wm. King
Indian Crow
All dead but me, Ezra Kind. Killed by ind[ians] beyond the high hill. Got our gold June 1834.

The inscription continues on the back and reads:
Got all the gold we could carry. Our ponies all got by the Indians. I have lost my gun and nothing to eat and Indians hunting me.

Controversy
Since its discovery in 1887, controversy over the authenticity of the Thoen Stone has circulated. Many people believe that the stone is a hoax and was fabricated by Louis and Ivan Thoen. Some have pointed to the fact that Louis Thoen was a stonemason. Until their deaths, the Thoens defended the authenticity of the stone. In the 1950s, Frank Thomson traveled to the East Coast in search of the families of the party's members. Thomson located several families, all with surnames similar to those listed on the Thoen Stone, who claimed to have had ancestors who disappeared in the American West.

In the 2000s, handwriting expert Marion Briggs and another in California compared the handwriting on the postcards and the writing on the slab. Both determined that the inscriptions were not done by the same person, and the stone was not inscribed by either of the two Thoen brothers, Cashner, or John S. McClintock, who was an early advocate for the slab's authenticity.

References

Black Hills
Pre-statehood history of South Dakota
Sandstone in the United States
Gold mining in the United States